Bundek is a park in the Novi Zagreb - istok city district of Zagreb, Croatia. It is located north of the Zapruđe and Središće neighborhoods. Bundek was renovated during 2005 to turn a badly maintained lake into a tourism and events center of Novi Zagreb.

Gallery

External links

 Bundek firework festival pictures.

Lakes of Croatia
Geography of Zagreb
Novi Zagreb